Sercu is a surname. Notable people with the surname include:

Albert Sercu (1918–1978), Belgian cyclist
Christophe Sercu (born 1970), Belgian cycling manager
Patrick Sercu (1944–2019), Belgian cyclist

See also
Sercus, a commune in Nord, France